Tell Khazzami or Tell El Khazzami is a small prehistoric, Neolithic Tell, about  in diameter, located around  Southeast of Damascus in Syria. It was destroyed by the construction of Damascus International Airport.

Four soundings were taken in a rescue mission in 1967 by Henri de Contenson who produced the first report in 1968. A single level of occupation was found with compartmentalised buildings made of regular shaped bricks and lime plaster floors with small hearths. Relatively advanced flint sickles and blades were found along with obsidian blades and relatively few arrowheads. Mortars and a base made of basalt were found. Contenson suggested that harvesting of cereals would have been more important than hunting for the inhabitants. Extensive amounts of pottery were recovered from the site including hand finished flat base dishes, deep bowls and jars. Vessels had handles, knobs, decoration and often given a red wash, which according to Contenson indicated a dating of the site similar to the later Neolithic stages of Byblos; he dated the site to the late 5th millennium BC.

Literature 
 de Contenson, Henri., Rapport préliminaire sur les fouilles à Tell el Khazzami en 1967, Annales Archéologiques Arabes Syriennes XVIII, 1968, p. 55-62.
 de Contenson, Henri., Le Néolithique à l'Est.de la Ghouta : Aswad, Ghoraifé et Khazzami, Contribution française à l'archéologie syrienne 1969-1989, Damas, 1989, p. 33-36.

References

Neolithic settlements
Neolithic sites in Syria
Archaeology of the Near East
Archaeological sites in Rif Dimashq Governorate